The House of Pignatelli was a Neapolitan family of Italian nobles, clergy, and men of arts and sciences. Members included:

Antonio Pignatelli, Pope Innocent XII (Spinazzola, 13 March 1615 - Rome, 27 September 1700) 
Domenico Pignatelli di Belmonte (November 19, 1730 – February 5, 1803) 
Ettore Pignatelli e Caraffa, 1st Duke of Monteleone (born Naples, died Palermo, Sicily, 1535)
Faustina Pignatelli Carafa, princess di Colubrano (died Naples 1785) Italian scientist
Francesco Pignatelli (February 6, 1652 – December 15, 1734) Italian cardinal 
Francesco Pignatelli (18th century) Vicar General of Naples under Ferdinand IV of Naples
Gennaro Granito Pignatelli di Belmonte (April 10, 1851 – February 16, 1948) 
Giovanni Battista Pignatelli sixteenth-century Italian riding master
Luciana Pignatelli (1935-2008) Italian fashion icon